Church of Saint Anthony of Padua is a Catholic church in , Belarus, built in 1908. The church is a landmark of the Grodno Region; it is listed as an object of Belarusian cultural heritage.

References

Sources 

19th-century Roman Catholic church buildings in Belarus
Churches in Belarus
Landmarks in Belarus